Chelfray is an Iraqi stew consistsing of lamb meat cut into cubes, potatoes, tomatoes, diced green bell pepper and hot pepper, salt and black pepper to taste and other mixed spices, all mixed together over a low heat.

See also 
 Mesopotamian cuisine
Culture of Iraq
List of stews

References

Iraqi cuisine
Stews